This is a list of the wild mammal species recorded in New Caledonia. There are sixteen mammal species in New Caledonia, of which two are endangered, four are vulnerable, and one is considered to be extinct.

The following tags are used to highlight each species' conservation status as assessed by the International Union for Conservation of Nature:

Some species were assessed using an earlier set of criteria. Species assessed using this system have the following instead of near threatened and least concern categories:

Order: Sirenia (manatees and dugongs) 

Sirenia is an order of fully aquatic, herbivorous mammals that inhabit rivers, estuaries, coastal marine waters, swamps, and marine wetlands. All four species are endangered.

Family: Dugongidae
Genus: Dugong
 Dugong, Dugong dugon VU

Order: Chiroptera (bats) 

The bats' most distinguishing feature is that their forelimbs are developed as wings, making them the only mammals capable of flight. Bat species account for about 20% of all mammals.

Family: Pteropodidae (flying foxes, Old World fruit bats)
Subfamily: Pteropodinae
Genus: Pteropus
 Ornate flying fox, Pteropus ornatus VU
 Insular flying-fox, Pteropus tonganus LR/lc
 New Caledonia flying fox, Pteropus vetulus LR/nt
Subfamily: Macroglossinae
Genus: Notopteris
 Long-tailed fruit bat, Notopteris macdonaldi VU
Family: Vespertilionidae
Subfamily: Vespertilioninae
Genus: Chalinolobus
 New Caledonia wattled bat, Chalinolobus neocaledonicus EN
Subfamily: Miniopterinae
Genus: Miniopterus
 Loyalty bent-winged bat, Miniopterus robustior EN

Order: Cetacea (whales) 

The order Cetacea includes whales, dolphins and porpoises. They are the mammals most fully adapted to aquatic life with a spindle-shaped nearly hairless body, protected by a thick layer of blubber, and forelimbs and tail modified to provide propulsion underwater.

Suborder: Mysticeti
Family: Balaenopteridae
Subfamily: Megapterinae
Genus: Megaptera
 Humpback whale, Megaptera novaeangliae VU
Suborder: Odontoceti
Superfamily: Platanistoidea
Family: Kogiidae
Genus: Kogia
 Dwarf sperm whale, Kogia sima LR/lc
Family: Ziphidae
Subfamily: Hyperoodontinae
Genus: Mesoplodon
 Blainville's beaked whale, Mesoplodon densirostris DD
 Ginkgo-toothed beaked whale, Mesoplodon ginkgodens DD
 Hector's beaked whale, Mesoplodon hectori DD
Family: Delphinidae (marine dolphins)
Genus: Delphinus
 Short-beaked common dolphin, Delphinus delphis LR/lc
Genus: Grampus
 Risso's dolphin, Grampus griseus DD
Genus: Feresa
 Pygmy killer whale, Feresa attenuata DD

Notes

References

See also
List of chordate orders
Lists of mammals by region
List of prehistoric mammals
Mammal classification
List of mammals described in the 2000s

New Caledonia
New Caledonia-related lists

New Caledonia